The evergreen forest warbler or Cameroon scrub-warbler (Bradypterus lopezi) is a grass warbler species in the family Locustellidae. It was formerly included in the "Old World warbler" assemblage.

It is found in Angola, Cameroon, Democratic Republic of the Congo, Equatorial Guinea, Kenya, Malawi, Mozambique, Rwanda, Tanzania, Uganda, and Zambia. Its natural habitats are subtropical or tropical moist montane forests and subtropical or tropical moist shrubland.

It has a subspecies, Bradypterus lopezi mariae, found in central and western Kenya to northern Tanzania.

References

BioLib

evergreen forest warbler
Birds of the Gulf of Guinea
Birds of Sub-Saharan Africa
Birds of Southern Africa
evergreen forest warbler
Taxonomy articles created by Polbot